Katerina Georgieva Maleeva (born 7 May 1969) is a former top 10 Bulgarian tennis player. She won eleven singles and two doubles WTA Tour titles. Her best position in the WTA rankings was No. 6 in 1990.

Biography
Born in Sofia, Maleeva is the second oldest of the three children of Georgi Maleev and Yuliya Berberyan. Her mother came from an Armenian family, which found refuge in Bulgaria after the 1896 Armenian massacres in the Ottoman Empire, and was the best Bulgarian tennis player in the 1960s. After she retired from professional tennis in the 1970s, Berberyan started a coaching career. She was the coach of her three daughters, Katerina, Manuela and Magdalena, each of whom eventually became WTA top 10 players.

Throughout her professional career, Maleeva has won a total of 11 WTA singles titles and two titles in doubles. In July 1990, she achieved her career-high ranking of sixth. She has a record of 369 singles wins and 210 losses. In 1994, she married Georgi Stoimenov, before retiring in 1997. The couple have two children and currently live in Sofia.

Major finals

Grand Slam tournament finals

Doubles: 1 (runner-up)

Performance timelines

Singles

Doubles

WTA career finals

Singles: 20 (11 titles, 9 runner-ups)

Doubles: 10 (2 titles, 8 runner–ups)

ITF Circuit finals

Singles: 2 (1–1)

Doubles: 1 (1–0)

Junior Grand Slam tournament finals

Singles: 2 (1 title, 1 runner-up)

In 1984 US open junior she defeated steffi graf in semis 7-5,7-6 & finally got the titles... but in doubles she partnered with steffi & lost in round 1 from niurka sodupe/shawn foltz 4-6,6-4,3-6

Fed Cup
Katerina Maleeva debuted for the Bulgaria Fed Cup team in 1984. Since then she has a 20–9 singles record and a 9–13 doubles record (29–22 overall).

Singles (20–9)

Doubles (9–13)

RPO = Relegation Play-off

See also
 Manuela Maleeva
 Magdalena Maleeva
 List of female tennis players

References

External links
 
 
 

1969 births
Living people
Bulgarian female tennis players
Bulgarian people of Armenian descent
Olympic tennis players of Bulgaria
Sportspeople from Sofia
Tennis players at the 1988 Summer Olympics
Tennis players at the 1992 Summer Olympics
US Open (tennis) junior champions
Grand Slam (tennis) champions in girls' singles
Katerina